Arugula is a common name used to refer to several edible species of the flowering plant family Brassicaceae (mustards). These include:

 Eruca vesicaria
 Diplotaxis tenuifolia (wild arugula)